Herbert S. White (born 1927) is Dean Emeritus and Distinguished Professor Emeritus at the School of Library & 
Information Science at Indiana University, and Adjunct Professor, University of Arizona, Tucson. A recipient of the ALA Melvil Dewey Award, White is the primary author of at least nine books, and the author of an estimated 200 articles in the professional literature of Library Science.  He is a major contributor to current theory and understanding of the role of the Special library in contemporary American organizations.

Current position

Distinguished Professor Emeritus,  Bloomington campus, Indiana University.

Education
M.S.L.S., Syracuse University, 1950
B.S., Chemistry CCNY
Library of Congress Internship in Science and Technology, 1950–53

Notable achievements

Herb White is the author of more than 9 books and 200 articles on topics of library administration, supervision  
and library automation; he has for many years been a frequent speaker and presenter at seminars and workshops. Now retired, he continues adjunct teaching at the University of Arizona, writing and lecturing. White is also widely known 
among professional librarians in the United States as author of the popular "White Papers" column published in 
Library Journal for more than a decade. Many of these popular columns were collected and republished in "Librarianship Quo Vadis?" (Libraries Unlimited: 2000).

Earlier career
Executive Director of NASA's Scientific and Technical Information Facility at College Park, Maryland 1964-68
Program Manager for IBM's Corporate Technical Information Center (1960's)
President of Special Libraries Association, 1970
Professor at Indiana University, 1975
Dean of Indiana University School of Library and Information Science, 1980
Awarded the title of Distinguished Professor at Indiana University, 1991
American Society for Information Science Award of Merit

References
"Introducing Herbert S. White" Current Contents (ISI) #3, January 26, 1972:

External links

Official Biography at Indiana University
LibraryThing book list (partial)
 (very partial)

City College of New York alumni
Syracuse University alumni
Indiana University faculty
University of Arizona faculty
American librarians
1927 births
Possibly living people